Shifu in Mandarin, or sifu in Cantonese, or sai hu in Hokkien, is a title for, and the role of, a skillful person or a master. The character 師/师 means "skilled person" or "teacher," while 傅 means "tutor" and 父 means "father."

Though pronounced identically and bearing similar meanings, the two terms are distinct, and their usage is different. The former term, 師傅/师傅, bears only the meaning of "master," and is used to express the speaker's general respect for the addressee's skills and experience; it is, for instance, the term frequently used for cab drivers or other skilled laborers—thus, a customer may use this term to address an automotive mechanic.

The latter term, 師父/师父, bears the dual meaning of "master" and "father," and thus connotes lineage in a teacher–student relationship. A tradesperson, for example, would address only their own teacher or master in this way; in the previous example, the mechanic's apprentice would address their master using this term, but a customer would not address that person in that way. By contrast, a senior religious person—and, by extension, experts in Chinese martial arts—can be addressed either as "master-father" (師父/师父) or simply as "master" (師傅/师傅) in all contexts.

Common usage
In Chinese culture, the term "shifu" is used as a respectful form of address for people of working class engaged in skilled trades, such as drivers, cooks, house decorators, sometimes for performing artists, and less commonly, also for visual artists such as painters and calligraphers. The more usual term of address for those accomplished in the visual arts is dashi (大师/大師), which means "great master". While there is no clear delineation of trades to which the term shifu can be applied, traditionally it would be used to refer to traditional trades where training is by apprenticeship, as "master" (shīfu 師傅/师傅) corresponds with "apprentice" (túdì 徒弟). Likewise, since religious instruction involves a teacher-student relationship akin to apprenticeship, bhikkhu (Buddhist monks) and Taoist priests are also addressed as sīfu or shifu. However, Taoist priests are addressed as sai gong (師公/师公) in Hokkien.

Practitioners of the learned professions, such as physicians and lawyers, are rarely referred to as "shifu", and some members of such professions may indeed find such a term of address disrespectful. Likewise, academics and teachers are not generally addressed as shifu. In China especially, but also traditionally in Taiwan and elsewhere, the preferred term for academic and learned professionals without special titles (i.e., excluding physicians), is often laoshi (老師/老师). Even for physicians, the title "laoshi" can be considered superior to "doctor". Those who have "earned" a right to be addressed as laoshi, such as medical professors or medical professionals who hold a research doctorate (i.e. a doctoral degree in the field of medicine and higher than a first professional degree) should be addressed as laoshi rather than "doctor". The same term can also be used for those engaged in other occupations which can be seen as analogous to academia and the professions, such as accomplished writers.

Use in martial arts
Traditionally, in Chinese martial arts shifu was used as a familial term and sign of respect as in the general usage. A shifu was deemed a "father", therefore his disciples would address each other as "brothers" or "sisters", particularly "big brothers" (shīxiōng 師兄), "little brothers" (shīdì 師弟), "big sisters" (shījiě 師姐) and "little sisters" (shīmèi 師妹). More specific familial prefixes could also be used, for example as in "biggest brother" (dàshīxiōng 大師兄), "second biggest (big) sister" (èrshījiě 二師姐), "third biggest (little) sister" (sānshīmèi 三師妹). Unlike actual familial prefixes however, dà-, èr-, sān-, etc. usually depended on the order in which a disciple was officially adopted by the master (i.e. seniority), not on their age. Likewise, whether or not fellow disciples are addressed as "big" or "little" brother/sister depended on whether they were adopted by the master before or after the subject, not on whether or not they are actually older or younger in age.

Despite the "father" meaning of the word 父, the term 師父/师父 is also used to address a female teacher, while the term shīmǔ (師母/师母) or "master-mother" is used to address a male teacher's wife. A female teacher's husband is addressed as shīzhàng (師丈/师丈) or "master-husband".

Additionally, there are also terms for the master's fellow disciples, such as "big uncle" (師伯) or "little uncle" (師叔), which also apply regardless of sex. Whether or not they are addressed as "big uncle" or "little uncle" also depends on when that person was adopted by the master's master, not their age.

The term takes on a less intimate context when a student becomes a formal student or disciple of the teacher. The acceptance as a student is a very formal event, usually requiring a discipleship ceremony called bai shi (拜師/拜师).  After the ceremony, the relationship is defined in a more direct parent–child context and usage takes on this term rather than a generic sign of respect for skill and knowledge.

See also
 Burmese: Sayadaw
 Thai: Ajahn
 Sanskrit: guru
 Japanese: sensei
 Tibetan: Lama
 Fashi: Masters of Rites in Chinese ritual mastery traditions
 Master Shifu, character in Kung Fu Panda
 Kung Fu (Ranking)

References

External links 
 

Chinese honorifics
Chinese martial arts terminology
Martial arts ranking